The Legal Services Act ( or RDG) is a German federal law which entered into force on July 1, 2008.

External links 
 Legal Services Act full text 
 English translation

Law of Germany